Oudt Leyden is a restaurant in Leiden in the Netherlands. It is a fine dining restaurant turned pancake-restaurant, that was awarded one Michelin star in 1957 and retained that rating from 1957 to 1979. It was again awarded a Michelin star in 1985 and retained that rating until 1989.

Oudt Leyden is one of the founders of Alliance Gastronomique Neerlandaise. In 1967, owner was S.M. Borgerding.

See also
List of Michelin starred restaurants in the Netherlands

Sources and references 

Restaurants in the Netherlands
Michelin Guide starred restaurants in the Netherlands